The Alba AR5 was an IMSA GTP sports prototype race car, designed, developed and built by Italian manufacturer Alba Engineering, in 1984. It competed in the IMSA GT Championship sports car racing series until 1988. It was powered by a number of different engines, including Buick/Oldsmobile V6, a Chevrolet V8, and a Ford-Cosworth DFL.

References

Le Mans Prototypes
24 Hours of Le Mans race cars
Ford vehicles
Rear-wheel-drive vehicles
Mid-engined cars
Sports prototypes
Cars introduced in 1984
Cars of Italy
Group C cars
IMSA GTP cars